The Imtiyaz Medal / Imtiaz Medal was an Ottoman military decoration, instituted in 1882. It was presented in two classes, gold and silver. The gold medal was the highest Ottoman military decoration for gallantry. When awarded during World War I, the medal was worn with a clasp in the same type of metal as the medal. The clasp depicted crossed sabers, with the date 1333 (1915).

References

Military awards and decorations of the Ottoman Empire
1882 establishments in the Ottoman Empire
Awards established in 1882